Madavan or Madovan or Madevan may refer to:
 Madevan, Darab, Fars Province
 Madavan, Jahrom, Fars Province
 Madavan, Khafr, Jahrom County, Fars Province
 Madavan-e Olya, Kohgiluyeh and Boyer-Ahmad Province
 Madavan-e Sofla, Kohgiluyeh and Boyer-Ahmad Province

See also
 Madhavan (disambiguation)